The Guild of St. Stephen or Archconfraternity Guild of St. Stephen is an international organization of altar servers.

History
The Guild of St. Stephen was founded in 1904 by Father Hamilton McDonald when he formed a society of altar servers at the Convent of the Sacred Heart (now Woldingham School) in London. In 1905, Pope Pius X, gave his approbation to the canonical establishment of the Guild at Westminster Cathedral.

In 1906, the Sacred Congregation of Rites made the guild an Archconfraternity, enabling all the parish branches to be linked with it. In 1934, the Guild spread, leading to Pope Pius XI's enabling of all Guilds throughout the British Commonwealth to be affiliated with the Archconfraternity at Westminster. The Guild is primarily under the patronage of the Blessed Virgin Mary, as well as that of St. Stephen (the Protomartyr, after whom the Guild was named), St. Thomas More, and St. Pius X.

Purpose
The purpose of the Guild of St. Stephen is "to encourage, positively and practically, the highest standards of serving at the Church's liturgy and so contribute to the whole community's participation in a more fruitful worship of God, to provide altar servers with a greater understanding of what they are doing so that they may serve with increasing reverence and prayerfulness and thereby be led to a deepening response to their vocation in life, and
to unite servers of different parishes and dioceses for their mutual support and encouragement."

Medals
Upon enrollment into the Guild, the server is presented with the Guild Medal, which is made of bronze and is worn around the neck, hanging from a red cord. The medal's meaning is twofold: firstly, that the parish priest, or local director of the Guild, has decided this particular server is eligible and worthy to be admitted to the Guild. Secondly, the server accepts and wears the medal as a sign of commitment to serve regularly as well as possible.

The letters "XP" are in the center of the medal, being the first two letters of the name "Christ" in Greek. At the top is the crown of victory given by God to everyone who overcomes evil, especially those who die for him. At the bottom are palm branches, traditional signs of martyrs who died for Christ. The motto of the Guild, "Cvi Servire Regnare Est," which means "To Serve is to Reign," is located around the edge of the front of the medal. The Latin words "Sancti Stephani Archi Soldalitas," or "Archconfraternity of Saint Stephen," are located around the edge on the back.

The material of the medal varies depending on how long a server has been a member of the Guild: The Bronze Medal is that which is given to a server upon enrollment; The Silver Medal, after 10 years of serving. The Silver Medal of Merit, is given after 20 years of serving, and the Gold Medal, after 50 years.

Other medals of the Guild include the Wooden Cross (which is used by some parishes for Altar Servers who have started serving prior to their enrollment), the Centenary Medal, which was commissioned for the centenary of the Guild in 2004, and the Gold Medal of Merit, which is granted to a server after 50 years of serving, but only to those enrolled after the age of 13.

Organization
The Guild of St. Stephen is led by the Superior General of the Archconfraternity, the Archbishop of Westminster. The National Director, appointed by the Archbishop, reports directly to the former. A lay Central Council, consisting of a President, Vice-President, Secretary, Treasurer and other members, assists in the running of the Guild. The Central Council is responsible for running the business side of the Guild and currently has members from Westminster, Lancaster, Brentwood, Southwark, Birmingham and Liverpool diocese's. Each year the Guild of St Stephen arranges events including a National Mass alternating from Westminster Cathedral and other Cathedrals around the country, a guild dinner. 

Many diocesan bishops appoint a Priest Director of the Guild for their own diocese and together these form a National Council of Priest Directors, which is an advisory body to the National Director. Some dioceses have organised their own local Lay Councils to assist the Diocesan Director in furthering the work of the Guild e.g. Brentwood Diocese.

The Guild may be erected in any parish with the permission of the bishop of the diocese and shall then be affiliated to the Archconfraternity at Westminster Cathedral. Thus, in each parish, while maintaining its objects and keeping the rules of the Archconfraternity, the Guild can be independent in its constitution and organisation.

Membership
Membership of the Guild is open to any server, regardless of age, who can serve Mass, and has shown a wish to live up to the objects and standards of the Guild.

Servers must be given adequate training and reach the necessary standard before being admitted to the sanctuary. They should then should serve satisfactorily for a minimum of six months before being enrolled as a member of the Guild. The parish priest, or the local director of the Guild, decides whether a candidate is eligible and worthy of admission to the Guild, and is empowered to perform the ceremony of enrollment and invest the server with the Guild medal.

Members of the Guild of St. Stephen are bound to follow various rules, including:
Serving at the altar with reverence, understanding and regularity and with due attention to personal cleanliness and tidiness;
Saying short prayers in preparation for and in thanksgiving after, serving Mass;
Observing silence in the sacristy and great reverence in the sanctuary;
Reciting the Prayer of the Guild of St. Stephen every day.

References

External links
 Guild Website
 Brentwood Guild of St Stephen Website
 Nottingham Guild of St Stephen Website

Catholic lay organisations
Guilds
1904 establishments in England